Ülar Mark (born 12 February 1968) is an Estonian architect.

He graduated from the Department of Architecture of the Tallinn University of Art (today's Estonian Academy of Arts) in 1995.

From 1999 to 2002 Ülar Mark worked as the chief architect of the city of Narva. Since 2002, Mark has worked in the architectural bureau Urban Mark OÜ. Ülar Mark is a member of the Union of Estonian Architects and from 2006 to 2007 was the chairman of the union. From 2009 to 2013 Ülar Mark worked as the chairman of the Estonian Center of Architecture. From 2009- Ülar Mark is partner of Allianss Architects OÜ.

Notable works by Ülar Mark are the gallery of the Bank of Estonia, the Tallink Spa Hotel and the new railway station of Tartu. In addition, Ülar Mark has designed numerous urban and planning projects in Estonia and abroad.

Mark has been in a long-term relationship with singer and actress Kärt Tomingas for many years. The couple has a daughter, Roberta, and currently live in Lääne-Viru County. Mark has also a son Ailan Daniel from a previous marriage.

Works
Single-family home on Silgu Street, 2002
Eurovision 2002 stage design
Gallery of the Bank of Estonia, 2004
project Joint Space for the Architectural Biennale of Venice, 2006
Detail plan of the Fortuna quarter in Tartu, 2006–2007
Hotel Haanja, 2007
Ugandi Spa hotel, 2007
New train station of Tartu, 2008
Tallink Spa hotel, 2008

Competitions
Fortuna quarter in Tartu, 2003; I prize
planning competition of Seewald, 2005
planning competition of the Koidu settlement, 2006
planning competition of the Maakri quarter in Tallinn, 2006
Joint office building of ministries, 2007
Embassy of Estonian Republic in Riga, 2007
New train station of Tartu, 2008; I prize

References

Union of Estonian Architects, members
Architectural Bureau Urban Mark OÜ, works
http://www.allianss.eu/eng/#/

Estonian architects
1968 births
Living people
Recipients of the Order of the White Star, 4th Class
Estonian Academy of Arts alumni